Le Rêve (French: The Dream) may refer to:

 Le Rêve (Detaille), an 1888 painting by Édouard Detaille
 Le Rêve (Picasso), a 1932 painting by Pablo Picasso
 The Dream (Rousseau painting), a 1910 painting by Henri Rousseau
 Le Rêve (Chagall), a 1927 painting by Marc Chagall
 Le Rêve (novel), an 1888 novel by Émile Zola
 Le Rêve (opera), an 1891 opera by Alfred Bruneau, libretto by Émile Zola, based on his novel
 "En ferment les yeux (le rêve)", an aria sung by Le Chevalier des Grieux in the Second Act of Jules Massenet's 1884 opera Manon
 Le Rêve (show), first production to open at the Wynn Las Vegas resort
 Le Rêve (Dubai), a residential tower in Dubai

See also 
 Reve (disambiguation)
 Rêves (disambiguation)
 Reeve (disambiguation)
 Reeves (disambiguation)